"The Celestials" is the first single from The Smashing Pumpkins' ninth album Oceania. It was originally sent to radio airplay as a promotional single on June 21, 2012. The band performed the song on The Tonight Show with Jay Leno on August 23, 2012.

Background and recording
In an interview with MusicRadar, Corgan stated, "I have all of these vintage keyboards that we just crank out when I need something, so I don't really know what's on here. It's some super, highly obscure '70s keyboard." He added, "The arrangement is kind of like classic MTV, circa 1994. You start with the acoustic and then the band kicks in grunge."

Reception
The track has received positive reviews. Tree Riddle of Loudwire praised the track's sound, stating "Acoustic guitar and orchestral swells dominate the beginning, along with Corgan’s tortured vocals (which actually have a better, more polished sound than on other recent works). Once the full band kicks in, you realize that this is the standout track on the album. 'The Celestials' employs all the elements that make a classic Pumpkins song, and is likely the best released under the name in over a decade. Corgan caps off the tune by matching the line "Everything I want is free" with a beautifully reserved lead guitar riff." RedEye favorably compared it to one of the band's biggest songs, "Disarm", from their album Siamese Dream, calling it a "...nod to the Pumpkins' past. Its acoustic guitar and orchestration make it, if not a sibling, then a distant cousin to the classic "Disarm". Similarly, CraveOnline compared it to the most acoustic aspects of their Mellon Collie and the Infinite Sadness album and said that "...The song is catchy but with a injection of prog-rock that keeps it from collapsing on itself."

The track was included on Loudwire's list of "Best Rock Songs of 2012."

Charts

References

External links
 

2011 songs
The Smashing Pumpkins songs
Songs written by Billy Corgan
Song recordings produced by Billy Corgan
Caroline Records singles
EMI Records singles
American rock songs